The Poolewe Stone is a Class-I Pictish stone discovered in 1992 in the cemetery at Poolewe (Poll Iùbh) in Wester Ross. The stone carries the common Pictish depictions of a crescent and v-rod. Chiseled inside the crescent are some hollows and two spirals meeting to form a pelta. Today the stone lies in the church yard.

References
 Fraser, Iain, Ritchie, J.N.G., et al., Pictish Symbol Stones: An Illustrated Gazetteer, (Royal Commission on the Ancient and Historical Monuments of Scotland, 1999), no. 135

External links
 

Pictish stones
Pictish stones in Highland (council area)
Scheduled monuments in Scotland